Memphis-Shelby County Schools (MSCS) is a public school district serving schools in Shelby County, Tennessee. MSCS directly operates optional and non-optional schools and oversees many charter schools.

Current Schools (2021-22)

Elementary schools 

A.B. Hill Elementary School
Balmoral-Ridgeway Elementary School
Berclair Elementary School
Bethel Grove Elementary School
Brownsville Road Elementary School
Bruce Elementary School
Campus Elementary School
Cherokee Elementary School
Chimneyrock Elementary School
Cordova Elementary School
Cromwell Elementary School
Crump Elementary School
Delano Elementary School
Double Tree Elementary School
Downtown Elementary School
Dunbar Elementary School
Egypt Elementary School
Evans Elementary School
Ford Road Elementary School
Fox Meadows Elementary School
Frayser Elementary School
Gardenview Elementary School
Gregorian Hills Elementary School
Germanshire Elementary School
Germantown Elementary School
Getwell Elementary School
Grahamwood Elementary School
Hawkins Elementary School
Hickory Ridge Elementary School
Highland Oak Elementary School
Holmes Road Elementary School
Ida b Wells Elementary School
Idlewild Elementary School
Jackson Elementary School

Middle schools

K-8 Schools 
Airways Achievement Academy
Barret's Chapel School
Dexter Elementary k-8
Douglass School
Gordon Academy
John P Freeman Optional School

High schools

Zoned (Non-optional) 

Bolton High School
Booker T Washington High School
Central High School
Craigmont High School
Douglass High School
East High School
Germantown High School
Hamilton High School
Kingsbury High School
Kirby High School
Manassas High School
Melrose High School
Mitchell High School
Oakhaven High School
Overton High School
Ridgeway High School
Sheffield High School
Southwind High School
Trezevant High School
Westwood High School
White Station High School
Whitehaven High School
Wooddale High School

Optional
 Medical District High School

Schools prior to July 2013

Elementary schools 

 Altruria Elementary School (Bartlett)
 Arlington Elementary School (Arlington)
 Bailey Station Elementary School (Collierville/Collierville Annexation Reserve)
 Barret's Elementary School (Unincorporated/Millington-Bartlett-Lakeland-Arlington Annexation Reserves)
 Bartlett Elementary School (Bartlett)
 Bon Lin Elementary School (Bartlett/Bartlett Annexation Reserve)
 Collierville Elementary School (Collierville)
 Crosswind Elementary School (Collierville)
 Dexter Elementary School (Memphis Annexation Reserve)
 Dogwood Elementary School (Germantown/Small Part of Western Collierville)
 Donelson Elementary School (Arlington/Lakeland)
 Ellendale Elementary School (Bartlett/Bartlett Annexation Reserve)
 Farmington Elementary School (Germantown/Extreme NW Collierville)
 Germantown Elementary School (Germantown)
 E. A. Harrold Elementary School (Millington/Millington Annexation Reserve)
 Highland Oaks Primary School (K-1, Memphis Annexation Reserve)
 Highland Oaks Elementary School (2–5, Memphis Annexation Reserve)
 Lakeland Elementary School (Lakeland)
 Lucy Elementary School (Millington/Millington Annexation Reserve)
 Macon-Hall Elementary School (Memphis Annexation Reserve)
 Millington Elementary School (Millington)
 Northaven Elementary School (Unincorporated/Memphis Annexation Reserve)
 Oak Elementary School (Bartlett)
 Rivercrest Elementary School (Bartlett/Bartlett Annexation Reserve)
 Southwind Elementary School (Memphis Annexation Reserve)
 Sycamore Elementary School (Collierville/Collierville Annexation Reserve)
 Tara Oaks Elementary School (Collierville/Collierville Annexation Reserve)

Secondary schools

Middle schools 

 Appling Middle School (Bartlett)
 Arlington Middle School (Arlington/Unincorporated)
 Bon Lin Middle School (Bartlett/West Part of Lakeland)
 Collierville Middle School (Collierville/Collierville Annexation Reserve)
 Dexter Middle School (Memphis Annexation Reserve)
 Elmore Park Middle School (Bartlett)
 Germantown Middle School (Germantown)
 Highland Oaks Middle School (Memphis Annexation Reserve)
 Houston Middle School (Germantown/West Part of Collierville)
 Millington Middle School (Millington/Millington Annexation Reserve)
 Mt. Pisgah Middle School (Memphis Annexation Reserve)
 Schilling Farms Middle School (Collierville/Collierville Annexation Reserve)
 Shadowlawn Middle School (Bartlett/Bartlett-Memphis Annexation Reserve)
Woodstock Middle School (Millington/Unincorporated)

K-8 schools 

 Riverdale School (Germantown)
 Lowrance Elementary School (Memphis)
 E.E Jeter K-8 School (Millington)

High schools 

 Arlington High School (Arlington/Memphis Annexation Reserve) 
 Bartlett High School (Bartlett)
 Bolton High School (North Part of Bartlett/Memphis-Millington-Lakeland-Bartlett-Arlington Annexation Reserves)
 Collierville High School (Collierville)
 Germantown High School (Germantown/Memphis-Colliervile Annexation Reserves)
 Houston High School (Germantown) 
 Millington Central High School (Millington/Millington-Memphis Annexation Reserves) 
 Southwind High School (Memphis Annexation Reserve) 

Note: Some areas within the Shelby County Schools coverage area were zoned to Memphis City Schools' Cordova High School (located in an unincorporated area and operated by Memphis City Schools) while being zoned to Shelby County Schools' elementary and middle schools.

Former schools

Secondary schools

High schools 

 Cordova High School – (The school was placed into the Memphis City Schools system in fall 2004) – Cordova High School serves some areas within the Shelby County Schools area that are zoned to Shelby County Schools-operated schools for elementary and middle school.
 Kirby High School – Hickory Hill was annexed by the City of Memphis in December 1998, thus placing the school in the Memphis City Schools system in fall 1999. Kirby primarily serves the southeast area of Memphis going to the current city-unincorporated county boundary line. Outside of this boundary, all schools are zoned to the Shelby County Schools.
 Northside High School – Closed in 2016 due to low enrollment.
 Raleigh-Egypt High School – Annexed with Raleigh in the 1970s. Serves the west and northwest area of Raleigh.

Middle schools 

 Kirby Middle School (Memphis, Tennessee)
 Raleigh-Egypt Middle School (Memphis, Tennessee) – Annexed with Raleigh in the 1970s.

Elementary schools 

 Brownsville Road Elementary
 Capleville Elementary – Former elementary school on Shelby Drive. Building destroyed by fire in 2009.
 Egypt Elementary – Annexed with Raleigh in the 1970s.
 Kate Bond Elementary School – (Kate Bond was placed into the Memphis City Schools system in fall 2004)
 Millington East Elementary School (Merged with Millington South)
 Millington South Elementary School (Merged with Millington East)
 Ross Elementary
 Winchester Elementary – Annexed with Whitehaven in the 1970s.

References 

Lists of schools in Tennessee